Intelligent Energy is a fuel cell engineering business focused on the development, manufacture and commercialisation of its proton-exchange membrane fuel cell technologies for a range of markets including automotive, stationary power, materials handling equipment and UAVs. It is headquartered in the UK, with representation in the US, Japan, South Korea, and China.

History 

The origins of Intelligent Energy began at Loughborough University in the UK during the late 1980s, when the University became one of Europe's first research and development centres for proton-exchange membrane (PEM) fuel cell technology. In 1995, the UK's first kW-level PEM fuel cell stack was produced by the R&D team.  In June of that year, Advanced Power Sources (APS) Ltd was founded as a spin-off from Loughborough University by Paul Adcock, Phil Mitchell, Jon Moore and Anthony Newbold, and was the first company in the UK formed specifically to address the development and commercialisation of PEM fuel cells.

Founded by Harry Bradbury, Intelligent Energy was established in 2001, acquiring Advanced Power Sources Ltd, together with its personnel and fuel cell related intellectual property that originated from research conducted by both APS and Loughborough University into PEM fuel cell technology. This triggered investment and enabled the company to grow its business activities.
In March 2005, it launched the ENV, the world's first purpose-built fuel cell motorbike, which gained the company recognition as a Technology Pioneer by the World Economic Forum in 2006. The ENV incorporated the company's air-cooled fuel cell technology hybridised with a battery pack to provide 6kW peak load to the motor to improve performance during spikes in power demand i.e. acceleration.

In 2007, a partnership was announced with Suzuki Motor Corporation to develop hydrogen fuel cells for a range of vehicles. In 2008, Intelligent Energy established the company IE-CHP in a joint venture with SSE plc, to develop fuel cells and other technologies for CHP (Combined Heat and Power) applications. In the same year, Intelligent Energy also produced the power system for the first fuel cell powered manned flight in conjunction with Boeing.
In 2010, its fuel-cell taxi received The Engineer Technology and Innovation Award.

In March 2011, the Suzuki Burgman fuel cell scooter, equipped with Intelligent Energy's fuel cell system, became the first fuel cell vehicle to achieve European Whole Vehicle Type Approval.

In 2012, SMILE FC System Corporation, a joint venture between Intelligent Energy and Suzuki Motor Corporation, was established to develop and manufacture air-cooled fuel cell systems for the automotive and a range of industry sectors.
During the same year, a fleet of fuel cell taxis incorporating Intelligent Energy's technology was used during the 2012 London Olympics. Part of the European Union-funded HyTEC (Hydrogen Technologies in European Cities) project launched in 2011, the taxis were used to transport VIP guests of the Mayor of London around the city.
In 2013, SMILE FC Corporation announced that it had established a ready-to-scale production line for its fuel cell systems, utilising Intelligent Energy's semi-automated production technology. IE-CHP also received CE certification for its first-generation product, a 10 kWe/12 kWth combined heat and power (CHP) fuel cell. The certification allows the product to be sold in the European Economic Area, confirming that the product satisfies all the EU regulatory and conformity assessment procedures covering the design, manufacture, and testing of the system.

Intelligent Energy was acquired by Meditor Energy, part of the Meditor Group, in October 2017.

In 2018, Intelligent Energy announced the launch of its IE-LIFT 802/804 fuel cell modules for power generation applications such as stationary power, micro-grids, telecoms, and critical infrastructure.

The company launched its Charitable Trust in January 2019. The Trust allocates £100,000 to local charities and voluntary organisations in the Charnwood area each year. The Charitable Trust's first year of awardees included Shepshed Dolphin Swimming Club, ADAPT Prem Babies, Citizens Advice Bureau, Loughborough University Students Union Action Section and The Bridge. During 2019, Intelligent Energy's IE-SOAR 650W UAV fuel cell module broke an Official World Record flight time of over 12 hours. The company also launched its higher power fuel cell module for UAV applications (IE-SOAR 2.4kW) which offers flight durations of over 5 times that compared to batteries and lastly, joined the Project ESTHER consortium at the end of the year. The goal of the project was to develop hydrogen fuel cells for use in passenger cars and heavy-duty vehicles.

In 2021, the company joined the H2GEAR programme. This programme involved the development of ground-breaking hydrogen propulsion system for aircraft with GKN Aerospace. In February of the same year, the company joined StasHH. The European consortium was created to introduce standardisation for heavy duty fuel cell modules, with the goal to successfully develop and integrate these modules into trucks and buses. In October 2021, the IE-LIFT 1T/1U fuel cell module for warehousing and materials handling equipment was launched. 

In 2022, Intelligent Energy and FES GmbH Fahrzeug-Entwicklung Sachsen (FES) worked together with BMW Group to develop a bespoke solution for the DS Automotion built Automated Guided Vehicles (AGV) in operation at the BMW Leipzig factory. The company was also chosen by Shell Pipeline Company for its pipeline inspection operations in the North-eastern United States. Using Intelligent Energy’s IE-SOAR™ 2.4kW on a Harris Aerial H6 airframe, the company was able to compare fuel cells with ICE hybrid technology. In August the company achieved 160kW from a single auto stack. Breaking the 150kW barrier has been a longstanding target for IE’s trademark fuel cell ‘stack’. At over 200 BHP, this is more power than the typical family car.

Technology 

Intelligent Energy's fuel-cell technology is divided into two platforms: air-cooled (AC) and evaporatively-cooled (EC). The air-cooled fuel cell systems use low-power fans to provide cooling and the oxidant supply for operation. Heat from the fuel cell stack is conducted to cooling plates and removed through airflow channels, a simplified and cost-effective system for the power range from a few watts to several kilowatts. They are used in a wide range of UAV, stationary power and automotive applications for two-wheel and small car range extender applications.

Evaporatively-cooled (EC) fuel cell systems provide power generation from a few kilowatts up to 200kW. Efficient thermal management of the EC fuel cell stack reduces system complexity, mass and cost. These systems are designed for high-volume, low-cost manufacturing, and use modular architecture that can be quickly modified to suit the application.

Market sectors

Automotive 

IE-DRIVE™ is Intelligent Energy’s (IE) latest high-power hydrogen fuel cell system. Utilising their patented evaporatively cooled (EC) technology, their fuel cells for automotive and stationary applications deliver compact, modular systems with fewer components, improved reliability, and reduced system costs. IE-DRIVE fuel cell modules can be used for trucks, vans, bus/coach, rail, marine, construction and stationary power. 

In 2010, the company was involved in the development of the report entitled “A portfolio of power-trains for Europe: a fact-based analysis. The role of Battery Electric Vehicles, Plug-In Hybrids and Fuel Cell Electric Vehicles”, produced by McKinsey & Company with input from car manufacturers, oil and gas suppliers, utilities and industrial gas companies, wind turbine and electrolyser companies as well as governmental and non-governmental organisations. The report concluded, amongst other findings, that fuel cell vehicles are technology ready, and cost competitive, and that decarbonisation targets for Europe are unlikely to be met without the introduction of fuel cell powertrains.

UAVs 

The company provides fuel cells to power UAVs and aerial drones. Its UAV Fuel Cell Modules, sat under the IE-SOAR™ product line, run on hydrogen and ambient air to produce DC power in a lightweight package, providing extended flight times when compared to battery systems. Our IE-SOAR fuel cell modules deliver clean power from 800W to 2.4kW, with the flexibility of integrating modules together to reach higher power outputs. Applications include pipeline inspection, surveying & mapping and security.

Stationary Power 

IE-LIFT™ is Intelligent Energy's eco friendly hydrogen fuel cell used across a wide range of applications including standby power, materials handling, telecoms, micro-grids and construction delivering zero emission energy. The product line provides a range of power outputs for diesel replacements and backup power. The company has field proven its fuel cell products in the Indian telecommunications market, with a tower uptime of close to 100%  and in recent years, integrated its fuel cells into welfare cabins situated on the HS2 site.

Materials Handling Equipment 

The IE-LIFT™ 1T and 1U are Intelligent Energy’s class leading 1kW fuel cell modules for motive and man-portable applications. With a compact size and high level of robustness, these modules can be easily integrated into systems for use in distribution warehousing, manufacturing facilities, and construction sites. The unique “U-Flow” air management system allows the unit to be integrated and operated efficiently in confined spaces, such as forklift trucks, MEWPs, and mobile lighting towers. 

The fuel cell modules are integrated into forklifts and AGVs to provide zero-emission power in warehouse applications, most notably with BMW Group in Leipzig.

Membership of industry consortia and trade associations 

The company is a founding member of UKH2 Mobility, a government and industry group aiming to accelerate the commercial roll-out of hydrogen vehicles in 2014/15;
It is also a member of the Fuel Cell and Hydrogen Energy Association, the US-based trade association for the fuel cell and hydrogen energy industry, dedicated to the commercialisation of fuel cells and hydrogen energy technologies.

Recognition and awards 

 2005 – The Sunday Times Tech Track 100.
 2005 – Popular Science: Best of What's New 2005 Award.
 2006 – World Economic Forum Technology Pioneer.
 2007 – Good Design Award, Transportation category.
 2008 – Rushlight Award, Hydrogen and Fuel Cells category.
 2009 – European Business Awards “Ruban d’Honneur”.
 2010 – Rushlight Award, Powered Transport category.
 2010 – The Engineer Technology and Innovation Energy Award.
 2010 – Tech Tour Award.
 2011 – Sunday Times Tech Track 100.
 2012 – Sunday Times Tech Track 100.
 2013 – Leicester Mercury Business Awards winner of Company of the Year.
 2013 – Sunday Times Tech Track 100.
 2013 – Deloitte Technology Fast 500 EMEA 2013
 2014 – UKSPA Anniversary Awards
 2015 – Edison Award, Gold
 2015 – BusinessGreen Technology Awards, Breakthrough of the Year and Technology of the Year
 2022 – Leicestershire Innovation Awards, 'Innovation in Technology' winner 2022

See also

 Alternative Energy Index
 Electric vehicle
 List of renewable energy topics by country
 Renewable energy commercialization

References

External links 

 

Fuel cell manufacturers
Electric power companies of England
Energy